Datuk Wong Tien Fatt (Pha̍k-fa-sṳ: Vòng Thiên-fat; 2 October 1954 – 28 March 2019), also known as Stephen Wong, was a Malaysian politician. He won to be the Member of Parliament for Sandakan in Sabah for two terms (2013–2019). He was also a nominated member of the Sabah State Legislative Assembly and the Minister of People's Health and Wellbeing of Sabah (2018–2019). Wong was also state chairman of the Democratic Action Party (DAP) for Sabah (2015–2019).

Political career

2013 general election 
In the 2013 election, Wong faced Liew Vui Keong of the Liberal Democratic Party (LDP) and subsequently won the parliamentary seat of Sandakan.

2018 general election 
In the 2018 election, was fielded by the DAP again to contest in Sandakan, facing a new candidate Lim Ming Hoo from the LDP. He won the election with a large majority.

Controversies and issues

Criticism of ESSCOM 
In 2015, Wong criticised the Eastern Sabah Security Command (ESSCOM) for its costly formation despite recurring kidnapping cases and expressed disappointment towards the "irresponsible and arrogant attitude by [sic]  the government leaders as it seems as they are trying to avoid the blame from public". A year before, Wong had urged the government to implement the re-issuance of identity cards in Sabah in response to the many immigrants from the southern Philippines.

Acceptance of Sabah State Awards and Datukship
In 2018, Wong accepted the Sabah State Award of Panglima Gemilang Darjah Kinabalu (PGDK) (which carries the title of "Datuk") in accordance with the Yang di-Pertua Sabah Tun Juhar Mahiruddin's 65th birthday; this was in opposition to the DAP's Central Executive Committee policy of disallowing the acceptance of awards and titles by elected representatives and local councillors during their period of active political service. Wong was neither apologetic to the party leadership nor willing to return the award.

Election results

Death 
Wong died at the Queen Elizabeth Hospital in Kota Kinabalu, Sabah, Malaysia on 28 March 2019 due to a heart attack during a morning hike on the same day. His body was flown back to his hometown of Sandakan to be laid to rest.

His death triggered the 2019 Sandakan by-election on 11 May. His former seat was successfully defended by his daughter and DAP candidate Vivian Wong Shir Yee by a majority of 11,521 votes.

Honours

Malaysia
  :
  Commander of the Order of Kinabalu (PGDK) – Datuk (2018)

References 

1954 births
2019 deaths
People from Sandakan
Malaysian politicians of Chinese descent
Malaysian people of Hakka descent
Malaysian Christians
Democratic Action Party (Malaysia) politicians
Members of the Dewan Rakyat
Members of the Sabah State Legislative Assembly
Sabah state ministers
Commanders of the Order of Kinabalu
21st-century Malaysian politicians